Rajeev Ram was the defending champion; however, he lost to Kuznetsov in the second round. 
Alex Kuznetsov won in the final 6–4, 7–6(1), against Tim Smyczek

Seeds

Draw

Final four

Top half

Bottom half

References
 Main Draw
 Qualifying Draw

Nielsen Pro Tennis Championship - Singles
2009 Singles